Cilix algirica is a moth in the family Drepanidae described by Patrice J.A. Leraut in 2006. It is found in Morocco, Algeria and possibly Portugal.

References

Moths described in 2006
Moths of Africa
Drepaninae